Cypress Avenue may refer to:

 Cypress Avenue (GoldLinQ station), a light rail station in Queensland, Australia
 Cypress Avenue (IRT Pelham Line), a station on the New York City Subway
 Cypress Avenue East Historic District, Ridgewood, Queens, New York
 Cypress Avenue West Historic District, Ridgewood, Queens, New York
 Cypress Avenue, Belfast, a Street in Belfast, Northern Ireland

See also
 "Cyprus Avenue", a 1968 song by Van Morrison